A kranskulla ("Wreath Maiden") (after kulla) is a Swedish woman appointed annually to give the winner of the skiing competition Vasaloppet a laurel victory wreath by hanging it around his neck. A man doing the same task for women winners is called kransmas ("Wreath Man").

History 
At the first Vasaloppet, the organizers had ordered a victory wreath from gardener Linqvist. As he walked to the finish line to deliver the wreath, he spotted two women, Therese Eliasson and Svea Romson, dressed in their finest folk costumes and asked if one of them would like to hang the wreath around the neck of the winner. Eliasson accepted even if she was a little worried about how to do this if the winner was tall since she herself was small. However, when the winner Ernst Alm approached the finish line, he stumbled and fell to his knees and thus she had no problem fulfilling her task.

The first kransmas was not appointed, but rather a male skier from IFK Mora, Mikael Stenqvist, who in 1985 was asked by the organizers to perform a small "coup". He was dressed in folk costume and waited just before the finish line with a wreath for the first female skier to appear. It was Maria Canins-Bonaldi from Italy who got the wreath.

In 2006, Martin Johansson was appointed kransmas. He made the race himself, finishing in 44th place and had 15 minutes to change before hanging the victory wreath around the neck of women winner Italian Christina Paluselli.

Function 
A kranskulla is a Swedish woman appointed annually to give the winner of the skiing competition Vasaloppet a victory laurel wreath by hanging it around his neck. She is dressed in the traditional folk costume of Dalarna.

A man doing the same task for women winners is called kransmas ("Wreath Man"). This title became relevant with the event of the women's race, Tjejvasan in 1988. During the year they have been appointed for, the kranskulla and kransmas serve as ambassadors for the race.

Criteria 
To be eligible for kranskulla, a woman must be unmarried, have distinguished herself in sports, worked at sports events and competitions. Her father's or other family members' sports merits are also taken into consideration. She must also represent one of the sports clubs IFK Mora or Sälens IF.

The criteria for the kransmas is that he must be a member of sports clubs IFK Mora or Sälens IF, a good representative and example for sports and/or a good sports coach, sports official or active in sports.

In other competitions 
Other competitions have adapted the use of kranskulla and kransmas after Vasaloppet. Even though these persons are not from Dalarna, the term and the old dialectal form has remained in the title.
Since 1968, a kranskulla has been appointed for cross country running competition Lidingöloppet. Both a kranskulla and kransmas are appointed for open water swimming competition Vansbrosimningen. Cross-country ski race Skinnarloppet has a kranskulla, as do bicycle race Storsjön Runt.

Vasaloppet 
Women and men appointed kranskulla and kransmas for Vasaloppet.

Kranskulla 
1922 – Therese Eliasson
1923 – Hilma Ström
1924 – Maja Lundgren
1925 – Elsa Cederlund
1926 – Aina Pers
1927 – Lea Ström
1928 – Stina Eriksson
1929 – Elin Henriksson
1930 – Ethel Eriksson
1931 – Anna-Britta Mattsson
1932 – Cancelled
1933 – Margit Nilsson
1934 – Cancelled
1935 – Marianne Edling
1936 – Inga-Greta Landeck
1937 – Gerda Berg
1938 – Majt Sundin
1939 – Anna-Greta Pettersson
1940 – Kerstin Cassel
1941 – Ingrid Asplund
1942 – Britt Herdin
1943 – Elsa Karlsson
1944 – Margareta Julin
1945 – Kerstin Sars
1946 – Elsa Sars
1947 – Nina Lindén
1948 – Ann-Mari Andersson
1949 – Kerstin Norlin
1950 – Karin Bergström
1951 – Inga Nyström
1952 – Åsa Mattson-Djos
1953 – Anna-Greta Beus
1954 – Birgitta Heimer
1955 – Kerstin Ingemansson
1956 – Gun Larsson
1957 – Barbro Persson
1958 – Anna-Greta Mattsson
1959 – Margareta Åhs
1960 – Maivor Olsson
1961 – Marianne Eriksson
1962 – Ann.Mari Hansson
1963 – Anita Håkansson
1964 – Anita Rosendahl
1965 – Gudrun Nilsson
1966 – Eva Runesson
1967 – Christina Fernström
1968 – Karin Abrahamsson
1969 – Christina Spansk
1970 – Karin Karlsson (now Green)
1971 – Ingegärd Backlund
1972 – Marianne Karlsson
1973 – Gunilla Lannerbro
1974 – Anna Mattsson
1975 – Lena Banck
1976 – Åsa Mattsson
1977 – Christina Andersson
1978 – Gunilla Lund
1979 – Britta Samuelsson
1980 – Inga-Britt Ax
1981 – Åsa Norell
1982 – Anna-Karin Winberg
1983 – Mait Eriksson
1984 – Marie Andersson
1985 – Eva Hermansson
1986 – Camilla Carlberg
1987 – Sara Kans
1988 – Karin Värnlund
1989 – Eva Lönn
1990 – Cancelled
1991 – Christel Asp
1992 – Maria Gustavsson
1993 – Helena Gezelius
1994 – Isabell Andersson
1995 – Malin Brandt
1996 – Katrin Svensson
1997 – Marika Engström
1998 – Ida Holmberg
1999 – Maria Wik
2000 – Emma Stefansson
2001 – Catharina Asph
2002 – Maria Bergqvist
2003 – Åsa Östberg
2004 – Lena Hermansson
2005 – Eva Lif
2006 – Julia Limby
2007 – Eva Svensson
2008 – Caroline Westling
2009 – Sandra Brander
2010 – Helene Söderlund
2011 – Frida Dahl
2012 – Johanna Axelsson
2013 – Isabelle Jansson
2014 – Lisa Englund
2015 – Viktoria Stärner
2016 – Hanna Eriksson
2017 – Lydia Sundin

Kransmas 
1988 – Axel Jungward
1989 – Mattias Helgesson
1990 – Cancelled
1991 – Erik Frykberg
1992 – Erik Eriksson
1993 – Jonas Orsén
1994 – Staffan Larsson
1995 – Mikael Helgesson
1996 – Thomas Sparr
1997 – Jonas Buud
1998 – Torbjörn Schedvin
1999 – Stefan Hansson
2000 – Thomas Eriksson
2001 – Niklas Karlsson
2002 – Mikael Hedh
2003 – Andreas Johansson
2004 – Niclas Jacobsson
2005 – Markus Leijon
2006 – Martin Johansson
2007 – Lars Suther
2008 – Joakim Engström
2009 – Jonas Nilsson
2010 – Johan Öhagen
2011 – Anders Solin
2012 – Erik Smedhs
2013 – André Gatu
2014 – Daniel Svensson
2015 – Victor Gustafsson
2016 – Johan Wellert
2017 – Linus Rapp

Notes

References 

Sport in Sweden
Honorary titles of Sweden